The 1980 Kerry Senior Football Championship was the 80th staging of the Kerry Senior Football Championship since its establishment by the Kerry County Board in 1889. The championship ran from 21 June to 28 September 1980.

AUstin Stacks entered the championship as the defending champions. 

The final was played on 28 September 1980 at Austin Stack Park in Tralee, between Feale Rangers and Austin Stacks, in what was their first ever meeting in the final. Feale Rangers won the match by 1-10 to 1–07 to claim their second championship title overall and a first title in two years. 

Mikey Sheehy was the championship's top scorer with 3-16.

Results

First round

Second round

Quarter-finals

Semi-finals

Final

Championship statistics

Top scorers

Overall

In a single game

References

Kerry Senior Football Championship
1980 in Gaelic football